Safe haven may refer to:
 Sanctuary

Arts and entertainment
 Safe Haven (novel), a 2010 American novel by Nicholas Sparks
 Safe Haven (film), a 2013 American film adapted from the novel
 Safe Haven (short film), a 2009 American short film starring Daniela Ruah
 Safe Haven (album), a 2017 album by Canadian singer-songwriter Ruth B.
 Safe Havens, a syndicated comic strip drawn by cartoonist Bill Holbrook
 Safehaven, an American television series by James Seale

Other uses
 Safe haven games, also called bat-and-ball games
 Safe-haven currency, a currency believed to be a safe investment, especially in an unstable market
 Safe-haven law, for the decriminalization of leaving unharmed infants with statutorily designated private persons so that the child becomes a ward of the state
 Safe Haven Museum and Education Center, in Oswego, New York
 Civilian safe haven, may refer to a no-fly zone in a military conflict

See also
Safe harbor (disambiguation)
Safe house